St. Barnabas Episcopal Church is a historic church at the junction of Tracy Lawrence Avenue and Bell Street in Foreman, Arkansas.  It is a single-story wood-frame structure, designed by A. M. Hawkins and built in 1895 for a congregation whose origins lay in a mission established in the 1840s.  The church has Gothic, Queen Anne and Stick style elements, including decorative cut shingles, stickwork in the gables, and Gothic lancet windows.  In the 1950s an old one-room schoolhouse was attached to the church to serve as a parish hall; this was destroyed in a storm in 1993, replaced by new construction in 1996.

The church was listed on the National Register of Historic Places in 1998.

Stained glass windows
A prominent feature of the church building is its stained glass windows examples of which can be seen below.

See also
National Register of Historic Places listings in Little River County, Arkansas

References

Episcopal church buildings in Arkansas
Churches on the National Register of Historic Places in Arkansas
Carpenter Gothic church buildings in Arkansas
Churches completed in 1895
Buildings and structures in Little River County, Arkansas
19th-century Episcopal church buildings
National Register of Historic Places in Little River County, Arkansas